Andy Robert Pando García (born 28 July 1983), commonly known as Andy Pando, is a Peruvian professional footballer who plays as a forward. His nicknamed is El Oso

Career
Pando began his senior career in 2003 with Segunda División side CD Universidad San Marcos He scored his first professional goal on 6 July 2003 in his club's win over América Cochahuayco in Round 10 of that season, with Pando scoring the winning goal. He stayed with Universidad San Marcos until the end of the 2006 season, scoring a total of 18 goals in four seasons there.

Finally in January 2007 Pando would have his first spell in the Peruvian top-flight by joining Alianza Atlético.
There he made his Torneo Descentralizado league debut on 14 February 2007 in a 0–0 draw at home against FBC Melgar.

In 2012 he played for Real Garcilaso and finished as the Torneo Descentralizado's top goalscorer with 27 goals. He was separated from the team before the second match in the final against Sporting Cristal. The club Garcilaso resolved his contract claiming he had a "lack of identification with the club".

References

External links

1983 births
Living people
Footballers from Lima
Association football forwards
Peruvian footballers
Peruvian Primera División players
Segunda División players
Categoría Primera A players
Deportivo Universidad San Marcos footballers
Alianza Atlético footballers
Colegio Nacional Iquitos footballers
Sporting Cristal footballers
León de Huánuco footballers
Real Garcilaso footballers
UD Las Palmas players
Club Deportivo Universidad César Vallejo footballers
La Equidad footballers
Unión Huaral footballers
Club Alianza Lima footballers
Deportivo Municipal footballers
Club Deportivo Los Chankas players
Peruvian expatriate footballers
Expatriate footballers in Spain
Peruvian expatriate sportspeople in Spain
Expatriate footballers in Colombia
Peruvian expatriate sportspeople in Colombia